Humam Khalil Abu-Mulal al-Balawi (25 December 1977 – 30 December 2009) was a Jordanian doctor and a triple agent suicide bomber loyal to Islamist extremists who carried out the Camp Chapman attack, a suicide attack against a CIA base near Khost, Afghanistan on 30 December 2009.

Aliases
An Afghan security official gave al-Balawi's  name as Hamman Khalil Abu Mallal al-Balawi. The Arab newspaper The National referred to him as Homam Khaleel Mohammad Abu Mallal. He also used the alias Abu Dujana al-Khurasani or Dujjanah al Kharassani when writing for jihadi websites. Hajj Yacoub, a self-proclaimed spokesman for the Pakistani Taliban, identified him as Hamman Khalil Mohammed.

Biography
Al-Balawi was born in Kuwait on 25 December 1977. He grew up in a middle-class family of nine other children, including an identical twin brother, and lived in Kuwait until Iraq's 1990 invasion of the country, when the family moved to Jordan. He graduated with honors from an Amman high school.

Al-Balawi studied medicine for six years in Turkey at Istanbul University and graduated in 2002. He also received medical training at the University of Jordan Hospital and at the Islamic hospital run by Jordan’s Islamic Brotherhood in Amman. He was married to Dafinah Bairak (Defne Bayrak), a Turkish journalist and translator, with whom he had two children. They lived in the lower-income Amman suburb of Jabal Nuzhah.

Al-Balawi had a history of supporting violent Islamist causes. He was tagged by the National Intelligence Organization of Turkey as having a relation with the Great Eastern Islamic Raiders' Front. It is not clear whether this information was shared with other intelligence organizations. According to the SITE Intelligence Group, which monitors extremist websites, he was a well-known contributor to al-Hesbah, an online forum run by Islamist extremists. He also ran his own Islamist blog.

Al-Balawi was arrested by the Jordanian security service in late 2007 and was believed to have been transformed into a double agent loyal to the U.S. and to Jordan. According to Western government officials, al-Balawi had been recruited by Jordan's General Intelligence Directorate and taken to Afghanistan. The Jordanian intelligence service is one of the CIA's closest allies in the Middle East.

According to intelligence officials, al-Balawi had been invited to FOB Chapman after claiming to have information related to senior al-Qaeda leader Ayman al-Zawahiri. He was not closely searched because of his perceived value as someone who could infiltrate the ranks of senior al-Qaeda leaders. The CIA had come to trust the informant, and the Jordanian spy agency vouched for him, according to officials.

According to a Jordanian report, al-Balawi was an "informant, who offered dangerous and important information which the authorities said they had to take seriously", but not recruited by the CIA or Jordanian intelligence. He was "only a trusted source who went onto the base without inspection" the official said.

Last statement
Al-Balawi appeared in a video released after his death and was shown saying that the attack was carried out in revenge for the 2009 killing of the Pakistani Taliban leader Baitullah Mehsud.

In his last statement issued by the Al Qaeda's media wing As-Sahab, he revealed that Jordanian intelligence was co-operating with the CIA to kill or capture senior Al-Qaeda and other militant group leaders. He further claimed that the Jordanian Intelligence Directorate assisted the CIA in killing Imad Mughniyah, a senior Hezbullah militant killed in Lebanon, and Abdullah Azzam, senior Afghan jihad leader, as well as assisting them to eliminate Abu Musab Zarqawi, who was the head of al-Qaeda in Iraq.

Interrogation of Al-Balawi's wife
After Al-Balawi's death, his wife Defne Bayrak was interrogated for almost five hours by Istanbul Security Directorate (Turkish police). According to the leaked information, the first question asked during the interrogation was how they had met each other to which she replied that they met in a chat room on a website that she accessed to learn Arabic. It is also said that CIA officials brought a file, containing information on al-Balawi and questions to ask during interrogation, and gave it to Istanbul Anti-Terror Branch Directorate. However, Istanbul Security Directorate denied any CIA involvement. Later, she gave extensive interviews to Newsweek Turkey and CNN. She also complained to The  Association of Human Rights and Solidarity of Oppressed People in Turkey about being constantly bothered by reporters.

Her main point during interviews was that al-Balawi never worked for CIA or Jordanian intelligence, wasn't their agent and only used them by pretending to work for them. In the interviews, she made al-Balawi appear to be someone who was obsessed about Jihad and felt guilty for not doing anything despite constantly writing on the subject. He was deeply affected by the occupation of "Islamic lands" by United States. She said that he had wanted to go to the conflict areas before but was unable because Jordanian intelligence strictly controls access of suspicious people to these areas. According to her he wasn't tortured during the 3 day arrest and was given a Quran to read but was prohibited from reading it out loud. She says it is probable that it was during interrogation that he convinced the intelligence agencies and gained easy exit to Pakistan. She denies knowing anything about his connection to intelligence services but admits concealing from his parents that he was in Pakistan and not in Turkey.  She also expressed great pride in her husband's suicide attack.

References

External links
Posthumous video statement  by Humam Khalil Abu-Mulal al-Balawi
Book review: 
 A message on the night of the Martyrdom Operation
 Transcript of the English video

1977 births
2009 deaths
Double agents
20th-century Jordanian physicians
Jordanian Islamists
University of Jordan alumni
Jordanian twins
Istanbul University alumni
Suicide bombings in Afghanistan
Afghanistan–Jordan relations
Suicide bombers
Jordanian mass murderers
Al-Qaeda bombers
Salafi jihadists